The Ministry of State Secretariat is a government ministry responsible for providing technical, administrative, and analytical support to the President and Vice President in the exercise of their state powers. The current minister of state secretariat is Pratikno, who previously served as Rector of Gadjah Mada University in Yogyakarta.

Duties 
The State Secretariat is responsible for providing technical, administrative, and analytical support to the President and Vice President of Indonesia, the details are which as follow:

 Providing technical and administrative support for the household, protocols, press, and media affairs of the president;
 Providing technical and administrative support for the household and protocols of the vice president, as well as vice-presidential analytical support to assist the president;
 Providing technical and administrative support of the president as the commander-in-chief of the Indonesian National Armed Forces concerning the promotion and dismissal of military officers, awarding of titles and honors, and the provisions on security coordination for the president, vice president, their households, and visiting foreign head of states/head of governments;  
 Providing technical, administrative, and analytical support concerning drafting of legislations, resolutions of legal issues involving the president and vice president, as well as drafting of presidential decisions for clemency, amnesty, abolition of punishments, legal rehabilitation, remission of life imprisonment conviction into regular imprisonment, citizenships, extraditions, and Indonesian membership in international organizations;
 Providing technical, administrative, and analytical support concerning inter-institutional relations between state institutions, non-structural institutions, regional institutions, public organizations, political organizations, and managing public complaints to the president, vice president, or the ministers;
 Providing technical, administrative, and analytical support concerning the promotions, dismissals, and the retirements of state officials, government officials, other officials, and the civil servants;
 Fostering, managing, and developing the bureaucracy, its organization, administration, and reforms, within the Ministry;
 Coordinating the duties, fostering, and administrative support within the Ministry, as well as the management of presidential archives, facilities for former presidents and vice presidents, and other administrative support for the presidential medical team;
 Managing state property/wealth within the jurisdiction of the Ministry;
 Coordinating and facilitating technical cooperation between the Government of Indonesia and various actors of development, as well as the administrative management of official overseas visits;
 Supervision over duties and responsibilities within the Ministry; and
 Executing other functions and duties as ordered by the president and vice president, or by law.

Organization 
Based on the latest regulations, which are the Presidential Regulation No. 31/2020 on the Ministry of State Secretariat and the State Secretariat Ministerial Regulation No. 5/2020 on the Organization of the State Secretariat, the ministry organizational structure is as follows:

Executive 
 State Secretary Minister, abbreviated into Mensesneg or simply Sesneg, heads the Ministry and its entire civil service personnel. The State Secretary is also a member of the Cabinet.

Secretariats 
 Ministerial Secretariat, headed by a Ministerial Secretary, tasked with providing general administrative support of the entire ministry. The secretariat is subdivided into:
 Bureau of Public Relations;
 Bureau of Information, Data, and Technology;
 Bureau of Administrative Support and Presidential Archive;
 Bureau of International Technical Cooperation;
 Bureau of Finance;
 Bureau of Planning; and
 Bureau of General Affairs.
 Presidential Secretariat, headed by a Chief of Presidential Secretariat, tasked with providing technical and administrative support for the president's household, protocols, press, and media, including the management of the Presidential Palaces and the presidential medical team. The presidential secretariat is subdivided into:
 Deputy of Administrative Affairs and Palace Management; and
 Deputy of Protocols, Press, and Media.
 Vice-presidential Secretariat, headed by a Chief of Vice-presidential Secretariat, tasked with providing technical and administrative support for the vice president's household, protocols, as well as providing governance support and policy analysis. The vice-presidential secretariat is subdivided into:
 Deputy of the Support for Economic Development Policies and Competitiveness Promotion;
 Deputy of the Support for Human Development Policies and Equitable Development;
 Deputy of the Support for Governance Policies and National Outlook; and
 Deputy of Administrative Affairs.
 Presidential Military Secretariat, headed by a Presidential Military Secretary, tasked with providing technical and administrative support for the president's role as commander-in-chief of the armed forces, especially in regards to appointments and dismissals of officers of the national armed forces and the national police force, bestowing state awards, titles, and honors, as well as security coordination of the president, vice president, their household, or visiting foreign head of state/head of government. The Military Secretariat also manages the adjutant for the President, Vice President, and their respective spouses. The Presidential Military Secretariat is subdivided into:
 Bureau of Armed Forces and Police Force Personnel;
 Bureau of Security Details;
 Bureau of Titles, Medals, and State Honors; and 
 Bureau of General Affairs.

Deputy Secretaries 
 Deputy Secretary on Legislations and Legal Administration, tasked with providing technical, administrative, and analysis support on legislation drafting, litigations, and other legal issues involving presidential and vice-presidential office, drafting of presidential decisions on clemency, amnesty, abolition of criminal punishments, rehabilitation, remission of criminal punishments, as well as issues on citizenship, extradition, and Indonesian membership in international organizations. The deputy secretary is assisted by:
 Assistant Deputy Secretary on Legal Administration;
 Assistant Deputy Secretary on Economic Affairs;
 Assistant Deputy Secretary on Human Development and Cultural Affairs;
 Assistant Deputy Secretary on Home Governance and Regional Autonomy; and
 Assistant Deputy Secretary on Political, Legal, and Security Affairs.
 Deputy Secretary on Institutional and Public Relations, tasked with providing technical, administrative, and analysis support on maintenance of relations with other state institutions, non-structural institutions, regional institutions, public organizations, and political organizations. The deputy secretary is assisted by:
 Assistant Deputy Secretary on State and Government Institutional Relations; 
 Assistant Deputy Secretary on Non-government Institutional Relations;
 Assistant Deputy Secretary on Public Complaints; and
 Assistant Deputy Secretary on Policy Materials Management.
 Deputy Secretary on State Apparatus Administration, tasked with providing technical, administrative, and analysis support on appointments, dismissals, and retirements of state officials, government officials, other officials, and civil servants, as well as bureaucratic reform and internal legal advocacy and litigations of the ministry. The deputy secretary is assisted by:
 Bureau on State Officials Administration;
 Bureau on Government Officials Administration;
 Bureau on Organization, Administration, Legal Affairs, and Bureaucratic Reform; and
 Bureau on Human Resources

Advisory Staff to the Minister 
 Advisor to the Minister on Politics, Defense, and Security, tasked with providing the minister with analysis and recommendations on political, defense, and security issues;
 Advisor to the Minister on Economic, Maritime, Human Development, and Culture, tasked with providing the minister with analysis and recommendations on economic, maritime, human development, and cultural issues;
 Advisor to the Minister on Legal, Human Rights, and Governance, tasked with providing the minister with analysis and recommendations on legal, human rights, and governance issues;
 Advisor to the Minister on State Apparatus and Bureaucratic Reform, tasked with providing the minister with analysis and recommendations on state apparatus and bureaucratic reform issues; and
 Advisor to the Minister on Political Communication and Public Relations, tasked with providing the minister with analysis and recommendations on political communication and public relations issues

Inspectorate 
 Ministerial Inspectorate, headed by an Inspector, tasked with providing internal monitoring within the ministry

Centers 
 Center for Apparatus Competence Development, tasked with educating and training State Secretariat personnel;
 Gelora Bung Karno Sports Complex Managing Center, tasked with managing Gelora Bung Karno Sports Complex in Senayan, Jakarta; and
 Kemayoran Complex Managing Center, tasked with managing state assets in Kemayoran, Jakarta.

Special Staff to the Minister 
 Special Staff to the Minister on Legal Affairs
 Special Staff to the Minister on Political and Institutional Communications
 Special Staff to the Minister on Institutional and Human Resources Transformation
 Special Staff to the Minister on Social and Cultural Affairs

List of ministers

See also
Government of Indonesia

References

Government ministries of Indonesia